The  was a limited express electric multiple unit (EMU) train type introduced in March 1972 by Japanese National Railways (JNR) in Japan, and later operated by East Japan Railway Company (JR East) and West Japan Railway Company (JR-West) until 2012.

Operations
The 489 series trains were developed from the earlier 485 series specially for use on the Hakusan and Asama limited express services operating over the steeply graded Usui Pass (Yokokawa Station - Karuizawa Station of old JNR Shinetsu Main Line). They were designed to operate in multiple with the JNR Class EF63 electric banking locomotives.

Formations
The nine-car sets operated by JR-West and based at Kanazawa depot for use on Noto and Hakutaka services were formed as shown below.

Cars 2, 5, and 7 were each fitted with two lozenge-type pantographs.

History
Following the end of regular Noto express services in March 2010, the three remaining JR-West 489 series sets based at Kanazawa depot lost their regular duties, and two sets were withdrawn in June and August of the same year.

The remaining set, H01, was used on a special "Arigato" ("Thankyou") run between Osaka and Kanazawa on 26 and 27 March 2011, after which it was stored at Kanazawa depot.

Set H01 was officially withdrawn on 1 June 2012.

Preserved examples
 KuHa 489-1: Preserved at the Kyoto Railway Museum in Kyoto since April 2016.
 KuHa 489-501: Preserved in Komatsu, Ishikawa (since March 2013)

References

Electric multiple units of Japan
East Japan Railway Company
West Japan Railway Company
Train-related introductions in 1972

ja:国鉄485系電車#489系
1500 V DC multiple units of Japan
20 kV AC multiple units